The Battle of Zumar was fought between the Islamic State of Iraq and the Levant and Kurdish Peshmerga troops over the city of Zumar in Nineveh province in northern Iraq. It started when ISIL launched an offensive on Zummar from 1–4 August 2014, resulting in its capture. On  25 October, after US airstrikes, Kurdish Peshmerga troops succeeded in recapturing the city, after an unsuccessful attempt to hold it in September.

Capture by ISIS
Beginning on  1 August 2014, ISIS attacked Kurdish Peshmerga positions in and around the city of Zumar. According to Kurdish sources, the initial advance of ISIS was repelled with some 100 jihadist militants and 14 Kurdish troops killed; 38 more ISIS jihadists were captured by Peshmerga. However, three days later, ISIS captured the town as well as its oil field.

Aftermath

Kurdish counteroffensive
On 31 August Kurdish Peshmerga troops entered Zumar. The Kurdish forces launched the offensive after capturing the Ain Zala oilfields just outside Zumar two days earlier. ISIL fighters torched three oil wells as they retreated from Ain Zala. The Peshmerga have been able to recapture several ISIL-controlled towns after receiving weaponry from the United States and other nations. As a result of the attack by Peshmerga forces on the Zumar, more than 92 ISIL militants have been killed and a further 160 taken to hospitals in Mosul with severe injuries. Kurdish forces were eventually forced to leave Zumar after enduring heavy losses.

French air strikes on IS
Qassim al-Moussawi, a spokesman for the Iraqi military, said on 19 September 2014 that four French air strikes with Dassault Rafale fighter aircraft, had hit the town of Zumar, killing dozens of militants, AP news agency reported.

Kurdish recapture of Zumar
On  25 October 2014, Kurdish forces launched an offensive on the town. ISIS forces put up fierce resistance, and launched a car bomb attack on Peshmerga forces. Iraqi television said that 50 ISIS fighters were killed and 10 vehicles destroyed. After seventeen US airstrikes on the town, Kurdish forces took control of it. Their future goal is to regain control of nearby Sinjar, which was the scene of a massacre against Yazidi Kurds. The Daily Beast reported that American and German special forces were involved in coordinating airstrikes in Zumar; a report which The Pentagon denied.

References

See also

 Spillover of the Syrian Civil War

Zumar
2014 in Iraq
2014 in Iraqi Kurdistan
Zumar
Zumar